The College of Visual and Performing Arts is an academic college of James Madison University in Harrisonburg, Virginia, USA. The colleges include three schools: the School of Art, Design and Art History, the School of Music, and the School of Theatre and Dance.  The college also includes the Madison Art Collection and the Institute for Visual Studies.

The college's majors were originally part of the College of Arts and Letters. On June 24, 2005, the Board of Visitors approved the Madison College Proposal, which created the College of Visual and Performing Arts out of the College of Arts and Letters.

School of Art, Design and Art History
The school offers undergraduate majors in Art History (BA), Studio Art (BA, BS, and BFA options), Graphic Design (BFA), Architectural Design (BFA), and Industrial Design (BS). Minors are offered in Studio Art, Design and Art History.  There are also graduate programs in Art Education (MA) and Studio Art (MA and MFA options).  The School of Art, Design and Art History is an accredited member of the National Association of Schools of Art and Design (NASAD) and the National Council for Accreditation of Teacher Education (NCATE).

School of Theatre and Dance
The school offers a Bachelor's of Arts degree (BA) with three undergraduate majors: Theatre, Dance, and Musical Theatre. Minors are offered in Theatre and Dance. The School of Theatre and Dance is an accredited member of the National Association of Schools of Theatre and the National Association of Schools of Dance.

School of Music
The School of Music offers a Bachelor's of Music degree (BM) with concentrations in Composition, Performance, Education, Music Theater, Jazz and Music Industry. The School of Music is an accredited member of the National Association of Schools Music (NASM). Currently, the university is home to over 30 ensembles, including The Wind Symphony, The University Symphony Orchestra, The Madison Singers, The University Chorus, The JMU Brass Band, The Pep Band, and The Marching Royal Dukes. The marching band with almost 500 members was the recipient of the Sudler Trophy, the highest honor available for a college marching band. In 2005, the School of Music received a gift from Dr. Elizabeth Swallow to designate the school an All-Steinway School.

Marching Royal Dukes 

The Marching Royal Dukes are the school's official marching band. Formed in 1972 (same as the football team), the "MRDs" perform at halftime and post-game at all home football games, and travel with the team occasionally to perform at away and post-season games.  In 1994, the MRDs were the recipients of the Sudler Trophy, the highest honor available for a college marching band, and was the second ensemble from a school with a I-AA football team to do so, after Florida A&M University

JMU Brass Band 
The JMU Brass Band is one of only a few collegiate brass bands in the United States. Formed in the Fall of 2000, the band has twice been named the North American Brass Band Association (NABBA) Honors Section Champion (2004, 2005), and is currently the 2019 NABBA Champion Section runner-up.

Facilities

Forbes Center
In September 2010, the college opened the Forbes Center for the Performing Arts, a complex composed of two connected buildings: the Estes Center for Theatre and Dance and the Roberts Center for Music Performance. The $82 million facility was funded by a Virginia higher-education bond package.

References

External links 
 JMU College of Visual and Performing Arts
 JMU School of Theatre and Dance
 JMU School of Music

James Madison University
Art schools in Virginia
Performing arts in Virginia